Kathleen L. "Kat" Brockway is an American author, historian, and deaf rights' activist.

Early life and education 
Kathleen L. Brockway was born in Washington, D.C.

Brockway, who is deaf, was adopted. Her family, who did not previously know American Sign Language (ASL), learned ASL Gallaudet University in order to teach Kathleen at home.

Brockway graduated from the Model Secondary School for the Deaf. She later attended Gallaudet University and graduated with a bachelor's degree at the University of Phoenix. Brockway is currently a graduate student studying Cultural Sustainability at Goucher College.

Career and advocacy 
Brockway served as chair of the National Association of the Deaf's Deaf Culture and History section from 2014 to 2018. From 2017 to 2018, she was Deaf History Researcher for the ASL Rose Company, a company that provides deaf-centered educational resources. Brockway currently works with the Deaf Cultural Digital Library.

Brockway has written two books; Baltimore’s Deaf Heritage (2014), and Detroit’s Deaf Heritage (2016). She was the first deaf author published by Arcadia Publishing as part of their Images of America series.

Brockway wrote an introductory booklet for the Shenandoah County Historic Society in honour of their 250th anniversary. The published 28-page booklet was released on March 26, 2022 titled, 'The Lost Shared Signing Community of Lantz Mills and Shenandoah County, Virginia'. Brockway coordinated a plan with the Lantz Mills booklet in honour of the Shenandoah County’s 250th anniversary celebration of deaf awareness month, which was hosted by the Library of Virginia and Shenandoah County Public Library and released a pop-up traveling display about Lantz Mill on September 8, 2022.

Awards 
Brockway was inducted into the Susan Daniels Disability Mentoring Hall of Fame in 2016.

References

External links 
 Interview, WYPR.org

Living people
Deaf writers
American deaf people
Gallaudet University alumni
21st-century American women writers
21st-century American non-fiction writers
People from Washington, D.C.
Year of birth missing (living people)